This is a list of Israeli football transfers for the 2014 summer transfer window

Ligat Ha'Al

Maccabi Tel Aviv

In:

 

 

 

 

Out:

Hapoel Be'er Sheva

In:

Out:

Hapoel Ironi Kiryat Shmona

In:

Out:

Hapoel Tel Aviv

In:

Out:

Maccabi Haifa

In:

Out:

Bnei Sakhnin

In:

Out:

Beitar Jerusalem

In:

Out:

F.C. Ashdod

In:

Out:

Hapoel Ra'anana

In:

Out:

Hapoel Acre

In:

Out:

Hapoel Haifa

In:

Out:

Maccabi Petah Tikva

In:

Out:

Maccabi Netanya

In:

Out:

Hapoel Petah Tikva

In:

Out:

Liga Leumit

Hapoel Nir Ramat HaSharon

In:

Out:

Bnei Yehuda Tel Aviv

In:

Out:

Hapoel Bnei Lod

In:

Out:

Maccabi Ahi Nazareth

In:

Out:

Hapoel Ramat Gan

In:

Out:

Hapoel Afula

In:

Out:

Beitar Tel Aviv Ramla

In:

Out:

Hapoel Nazareth Illit

In:

Out:

Maccabi Yavne

In:

Out:

Maccabi Herzliya

In:

Out:

Hapoel Rishon LeZion

In:

Out:

Hapoel Jerusalem

In:

Out:

Hakoah Amidar Ramat Gan

In:

Out:

Maccabi Kiryat Gat

In:

Out:

Hapoel Kfar Saba

In:

Out:

Ironi Tiberias

In:

Out:

References

Israel
2014
Transfers